Oleksandr Volodymyrovych Sevidov (born 18 July 1969) is a Ukrainian football manager and former player. He played for clubs in Ukraine and Russia. He was appointed manager of struggling Vereya in January 2019, remaining in that capacity until late March 2019.

References

External links

 
 Profile at football.ua
 Profile at soccerway

1969 births
Living people
Footballers from Donetsk
Soviet footballers
Ukrainian footballers
Ukrainian expatriate footballers
Association football midfielders
Expatriate footballers in Russia
FC Zorya Luhansk players
FC Dynamo Luhansk players
FC Kryvbas Kryvyi Rih players
FC Metalurh Donetsk players
FC Metalurh Zaporizhzhia players
Ukrainian Premier League players
FC Torpedo Moscow players
FC Torpedo-2 players
Russian Premier League players
FC Torpedo Miass players
Ukrainian football managers
Ukrainian Premier League managers
FC Metalurh Donetsk managers
FC Metalurh-2 Donetsk managers
FC Stal Kamianske managers
Expatriate football managers in Moldova
FC Zimbru Chișinău managers
FC Hoverla Uzhhorod managers
FC Krymteplytsia Molodizhne managers
FC Karpaty Lviv managers
Ukrainian expatriate football managers
Ukrainian expatriate sportspeople in Russia
Ukrainian expatriate sportspeople in Moldova
Ukrainian expatriate sportspeople in Bulgaria
FC Metalist Kharkiv managers
FC Mariupol managers
FC Helios Kharkiv managers
Moldovan Super Liga managers
PFC CSKA Moscow players